The 1920 Londonderry County Council election was held on Thursday, 3 June 1920.

Council results

Division results

Coleraine

Dungiven
The Dungiven Electoral Area comprised the District Electoral Divisions of Ardmore, Ballykelly, Ballymullins, Banagher, Bondsglen, Claudy, Drum, Dungiven, Eglinton, Faughanvale, Fenny, Foreglen, Glendermott, Glenshane, Lough Enagh, Lower Liberties, Myroe, Owenreagh, Straw, Tamnaherin, The Highlands, Upper Liberties, and Waterside.

Magherafelt

Kilrea

Rural District Elections

Derry No.1 Rural

References

1920 Irish local elections